The 2018 NBL Finals were the championship series of the 2017–18 NBL season and the conclusion of the season. The semi-finals started on 3 March and ended 9 March 2018. The Grand Final series started on 16 March and ended on 31 March 2018. Melbourne United won its fifth NBL championship title.

Format
The 2017–18 National Basketball League Finals will be played in March 2018 between the top four teams of the regular season, consisting of two best-of-three semi-final and one best-of-five final series, where the higher seed hosts the first, third and fifth games.

Qualification

Qualified teams

Ladder

Seedings
 Melbourne United
 Adelaide 36ers
 Perth Wildcats
 New Zealand Breakers

The NBL tie-breaker system as outlined in the NBL Rules and Regulations states that in the case of an identical win–loss record, the overall points percentage will determine order of seeding.

Playoff bracket

Semi-finals series

(1) Melbourne United vs (4) New Zealand Breakers

Regular season series

Tied 2–2 in the regular season series; 351-346 points differential to New Zealand:

(2) Adelaide 36ers vs (3) Perth Wildcats

Regular season series

Tied 2–2 in the regular season series; 367-360 points differential to Perth:

Grand Final series

(1) Melbourne United vs (2) Adelaide 36ers

See also 
 2017–18 NBL season

References 

2017–18 NBL season
National Basketball League (Australia) Finals